Chi III or Chi 3 is a residential locality in south-western Greater Noida, Uttar Pradesh, India. Bordered by Phi I, Chi II and Chi I to the north and Chi IV the south, it is known to be one of the real estate hotspots of Greater Noida, alongside Omega II, Omega I, Phi I, Phi III, Phi IV, Phi II, Chi II, Chi I, Chi IV and Chi V. It is named after the Greek letter Chi.

References 

Uttar Pradesh